Leigh Noyes (December 15, 1885 – March 24, 1961) was a Vice Admiral in the United States Navy during World War II. He was Director of Naval Communications before the outbreak of World War II and later served as Commander, Carrier Division 3 and Commander, Naval Air Force, Pacific Fleet.

Biography

Graduated from the U.S. Naval Academy in 1906, he won the Navy Cross while serving as Flag Secretary and Fleet Communication Officer of the Atlantic Fleet during World War I. He was also decorated with the Russian Order of Saint Stanislaus, 3rd Class for the saving of Russian refugees from a sinking boat in the Black Sea.

In 1938, he was appointed as Chief of staff, Aircraft, Battle Force.

At the time war broke out in 1941, Rear Admiral Noyes was Director of Naval Communications in Washington and was accused of not passing along the "Bomb Plot" intercept of 9 October 1941 indicating that the Japanese Consulate in Honolulu was under instructions to report ship locations in Pearl Harbor. In March 1942, he was sent to Pearl Harbor servicing as Admiral Halsey's shore administrator. He was considered to replace Halsey for Midway but instead Admiral Raymond A. Spruance was selected.

After Wasp was torpedoed on September 14, 1942 he was criticized for his actions and reassigned as commander, Naval Air Force, Pacific Fleet which he held until October 1942. In 1945 he was appointed to the position of President, Board of Inspection and Survey, serving till 1946 when he retired. He was promoted to vice admiral in the retired list in 1950.

Decorations

Here is the ribbon bar of Vice Admiral Leigh Noyes:

References 

1885 births
1961 deaths
People from St. Johnsbury, Vermont
United States Navy vice admirals
United States Naval Aviators
United States Naval Academy alumni
Naval War College alumni
United States Navy personnel of World War I
United States Navy World War II admirals
Recipients of the Navy Cross (United States)
Recipients of the Legion of Merit
Burials at Arlington National Cemetery